This list of mammals of Ohio includes a total of 70 mammal species recorded in the state of Ohio. Of these, three (the American black bear, Indiana bat, and Allegheny woodrat) are listed as endangered in the state; four (the brown rat, black rat, house mouse, and wild boar) are introduced; three (the gray bat, Mexican free-tailed bat and North American porcupine) are considered accidental; and ten (the American bison, elk, Allegheny woodrat, snowshoe hare, fisher, cougar, Canada lynx, eastern wolf, marsh rice rat and the American marten) have been extirpated from the state.

Order: Didelphimorphia

Opossums
Family: Didelphidae

 Virginia opossum, Didelphis virginiana

Order: Eulipotyphla

Shrews

Family: Soricidae

 Northern short-tailed shrew, Blarina brevicauda
 North American least shrew, Cryptotis parva
 Masked shrew, Sorex cinereus
 Smoky shrew, Sorex fumeus
 American pygmy shrew, Sorex hoyi

Moles
Family: Talpidae

 Star-nosed mole, Condylura cristata
 Hairy-tailed mole, Parascalops breweri
 Eastern mole, Scalopus aquaticus

Order: Chiroptera

Vesper bats

Family: Vespertilionidae

 Rafinesque's big-eared bat, Corynorhinus rafinesquii
 Big brown bat, Eptesicus fuscus
 Silver-haired bat, Lasionycteris noctivagans
 Eastern red bat, Lasiurus borealis
 Hoary bat, Lasiurus cinereus
 Gray bat, Myotis grisescens 
 Eastern small-footed bat, Myotis leibii
 Little brown bat, Myotis lucifugus
 Northern long-eared bat, Myotis septentrionalis
 Indiana bat, Myotis sodalis 
 Evening bat, Nycticeius humeralis
 Tricolored bat, Perimyotis subflavus

Free-tailed bats
Family: Molossidae

 Mexican free-tailed bat, Tadarida brasiliensis

Order: Lagomorpha

Rabbits and hares
Family: Leporidae

 Snowshoe hare, Lepus americanus extirpated
 Eastern cottontail, Sylvilagus floridanus

Order: Rodentia

Squirrels

Family: Sciuridae

 Southern flying squirrel, Glaucomys volans
 Thirteen-lined ground squirrel, Ictidomys tridecemlineatus
 Groundhog, Marmota monax
 Eastern gray squirrel, Sciurus carolinensis
 Fox squirrel, Sciurus niger
 Eastern chipmunk, Tamias striatus
 American red squirrel, Tamiasciurus hudsonicus

Beavers
Family: Castoridae

 North American beaver, Castor canadensis

Jumping mice
Family: Dipodidae

 Woodland jumping mouse, Napaeozapus insignis
 Meadow jumping mouse, Zapus hudsonius

New World mice, rats, and voles

Family: Cricetidae

 Prairie vole, Microtus ochrogaster
 Meadow vole, Microtus pennsylvanicus
 Pine vole, Microtus pinetorum
 Southern red-backed vole, Myodes gapperi 
 Allegheny woodrat, Neotoma magister extirpated
 Muskrat, Ondatra zibethicus
 Marsh rice rat, Oryzomys palustris extirpated
 White-footed mouse, Peromyscus leucopus
 Eastern deer mouse, Peromyscus maniculatus
 Eastern harvest mouse, Reithrodontomys humulis
 Southern bog lemming, Synaptomys cooperi

Old World mice and rats
Family: Muridae

 House mouse, Mus musculus introduced
 Brown rat, Rattus norvegicus introduced
 Black rat, Rattus rattus introduced

New World porcupines
Family: Erethizontidae

 North American porcupine, Erethizon dorsatum vagrant

Order: Carnivora

Canids (wolves, coyotes, and foxes)

Family: Canidae

 Coyote, Canis latrans
 Eastern wolf, Canis lycaon extirpated
 Gray fox, Urocyon cinereoargenteus
 Red fox, Vulpes vulpes

Bears
Family: Ursidae

 American black bear, Ursus americanus

Raccoons
Family: Procyonidae

 Raccoon, Procyon lotor

Mustelids

Family: Mustelidae

 North American river otter, Lontra canadensis
 American marten, Martes americana extirpated
 Least weasel, Mustela nivalis
American ermine, Mustela richardsonii 
 Long-tailed weasel, Neogale frenata
 American mink, Neogale vison
 Fisher, Pekania pennanti extirpated
 American badger, Taxidea taxus

Skunks
Family: Mephitidae

 Striped skunk, Mephitis mephitis

Cats

Family: Felidae

 Bobcat, Lynx rufus
 Cougar, Puma concolor extirpated
Eastern cougar, P. c. couguar

Order: Artiodactyla

Deer
Family: Cervidae

 Elk, Cervus canadensis extirpated
Eastern elk, C. c. canadensis 
 White-tailed deer, Odocoileus virginianus

Bovids
Family: Bovidae

 American bison, Bison bison extirpated
Plains bison, B. b. bison extirpated

Pigs
Family: Suidae

 Wild boar, Sus scrofa introduced

See also
 Lists of mammals by region
 List of U.S. state mammals
 List of birds of Ohio

References

Ohio
Mammals of Ohio